The 1921–22 Missouri Tigers men's basketball team represented the University of Missouri in intercollegiate basketball during the 1921–22 season. The team finished the season with a 16–1 record and was retroactively named the 1921–22 national champion by the Premo-Porretta Power Poll. It was head coach Craig Ruby's second and final season coaching the team.

References

Missouri
Missouri Tigers men's basketball seasons
NCAA Division I men's basketball tournament championship seasons
Missouri Tigers Men's Basketball Team
Missouri Tigers Men's Basketball Team